Imma rugosalis is a moth in the family Immidae. It was described by Francis Walker in 1859. It is found in Sri Lanka.

The forewings are fuscous, with a darker discal dot at two-thirds. The hindwings are darker fuscous.

References

Moths described in 1859
Immidae
Moths of Asia
Taxa named by Francis Walker (entomologist)